Normandykes (Grid Reference: NO 830994) is the site of a Roman marching camp  to the southwest of Peterculter, City of Aberdeen, Scotland. Aerial photographs for Normandykes have been archived between 1947 and 1976. It is possible that the actual route taken would have entailed one day's march, over a route likely chosen to avoid the Red Moss, a virtually uncrossable bog near the present day village of Netherley. 

Normandykes was first mentioned as Norman's Dyke and interpreted as a Danish Camp in 1795, but then corrected in the New Statistical Account of 1845 as Roman.

The camp was first excavated in the year 1935 by Richmond and MacIntyre; construction is thought to date to the Antonine or Severan periods.

The site is designated a scheduled ancient monument.

See also
 Raedykes
 Balbridie
 Crynoch Burn
 Deers Den
 Glenmailen
 Leuchar Burn
 Maryculter House
 Ythan Wells
 Muiryfold

References

Archaeological sites in Aberdeenshire
Roman fortified camps in Scotland
Scheduled Ancient Monuments in Aberdeen